Mario Konzett (born 4 June 1962) is a Liechtensteiner former alpine skier who competed in the 1984 Winter Olympics.

References

External links
 

1962 births
Living people
Liechtenstein male alpine skiers
Olympic alpine skiers of Liechtenstein
Alpine skiers at the 1984 Winter Olympics